A poll tax is a tax of a fixed sum on every liable individual (typically every adult), without reference to income or resources. Although often associated with states of the former Confederate States of America, poll taxes were also in place in some northern and western states, including California, Connecticut, Maine, Massachusetts, Minnesota, New Hampshire, Ohio, Pennsylvania, Vermont and Wisconsin. Poll taxes had been a major source of government funding among the colonies which formed the United States. Poll taxes made up from one-third to one-half of the tax revenue of colonial Massachusetts. Various privileges of citizenship, including voter registration or issuance of driving licenses and resident hunting and fishing licenses, were conditioned on payment of poll taxes to encourage the collection of this tax revenue. Property taxes assumed a larger share of tax revenues as land values rose when population increases encouraged settlement of the American West. Some western states found no need for poll tax requirements; but poll taxes and payment incentives remained in eastern states, and some links to voter registration were modified following the American Civil War until court action following ratification of the 24th Amendment in 1964.

Voter registration
Payment of a poll tax was a prerequisite to the registration for voting in a number of states until 1965. The tax emerged in some states of the United States in the late nineteenth century as part of the Jim Crow laws. After the right to vote was extended to all races by the enactment of the Fifteenth Amendment to the United States Constitution, a number of states enacted poll tax laws as a device for restricting voting rights. The laws often included a grandfather clause, which allowed any adult male whose father or grandfather had voted in a specific year prior to the abolition of slavery to vote without paying the tax.  These laws, along with unfairly implemented literacy tests and extra-legal intimidation, such as by the Ku Klux Klan, achieved the desired effect of disenfranchising Asian-American, Native American voters and poor whites as well, but in particular the poll tax was disproportionately directed at African-American voters.

Proof of payment of a poll tax was a prerequisite to voter registration in Florida, Alabama, Tennessee, Arkansas, Louisiana, Mississippi, Georgia (1877), North and South Carolina, Virginia (until 1882 and again from 1902 with its new constitution), and Texas (1902). The Texas poll tax, instituted on people who were eligible to vote in all other respects, was between $1.50 and $1.75 . This was "a lot of money at the time, and a big barrier to the working classes and poor." Georgia created a cumulative poll tax requirement in 1877: men of any race 21 to 60 years of age had to pay a sum of money for every year from the time they had turned 21, or from the time that the law took effect.

The poll tax requirements applied to whites as well as blacks, and also adversely affected poor citizens. The laws that allowed the poll tax did not specify a certain group of people. This meant that anyone, including white women, could also be discriminated against when they went to vote. One example is in Alabama where white women were discriminated against and then organized to secure their right to vote. One group of women that did this was the Women's Joint Legislative Council of Alabama (WJLC). African American women also organized in groups against being denied voting rights. In 1942, an African American woman named Lottie Polk Gaffney, along with four other women, unsuccessfully sued the South Carolina Cherokee County Registration Board with the help of the NAACP. Gaffney sued for her right to vote after having been stopped from registering to vote two years earlier. As a result of her suing the county the mailman did not deliver her mail for quite some time. 

Many states required payment of the tax at a time separate from the election, and then required voters to bring receipts with them to the polls. If they could not locate such receipts, they could not vote. In addition, many states surrounded registration and voting with complex record-keeping requirements. These were particularly difficult for sharecropper and tenant farmers to comply with, as they moved frequently.

The poll tax was sometimes used alone or together with a literacy qualification. In a kind of grandfather clause, North Carolina in 1900 exempted from the poll tax those men entitled to vote as of January 1, 1867. This excluded all blacks, who did not then have suffrage.

Judicial challenge
In 1937, in Breedlove v. Suttles, 302 U.S. 277 (1937), the United States Supreme Court found that a prerequisite that poll taxes be paid for registration to vote was constitutional. The case involved the Georgia poll tax of $1. Georgia abolished its poll tax in 1945. Florida repealed its poll tax in 1937.

The 24th Amendment, ratified in 1964, abolished the use of the poll tax (or any other tax) as a pre-condition for voting in federal elections, but made no mention of poll taxes in state elections.

In the 1966 case of Harper v. Virginia State Board of Elections, the Supreme Court reversed its decision in Breedlove v. Suttles to also include state elections as violating the Equal Protection Clause of the 14th Amendment to the United States Constitution.

The Harper ruling was one of several that relied on the Equal Protection clause of the 14th Amendment rather than the more direct provision of the 15th Amendment. In a two-month period in the spring of 1966, Federal courts declared unconstitutional poll tax laws in the last four states that still had them, starting with Texas on February 9. Decisions followed for Alabama (March 3) and Virginia (March 25). Mississippi's $2.00 poll tax was the last to fall, declared unconstitutional on April 8, 1966, by a federal panel. Virginia attempted to partially abolish its poll tax by requiring a residence certification, but the Supreme Court rejected the arrangement in 1965 in Harman v. Forssenius.

Poll taxes by state

See also
Women's poll tax repeal movement
Voter ID laws in the United States

References
Informational notes

Citations

Further reading

History of taxation in the United States
History of voting rights in the United States
Poll taxes